Vengeance in Death (1997) is the 6th novel in the "...in Death" series written by J. D. Robb a.k.a. Nora Roberts. The novel continues where the previous Ceremony in Death left off.

Plot introduction 
Lt. Eve Dallas is shocked by the brutal nature of a series of murders. The crimes are clearly related and Eve makes a shocking discovery—a common link between the victims: her husband, Roarke. Roarke's past has come back to haunt them both.

References

1997 American novels
In Death (novel series)